The Oahu Interscholastic Association (OIA) is an athletic conference composed of all public secondary schools on the island of Oahu, Hawaii, U.S.A. The OIA was first founded in 1940 as the Rural Oahu Interscholastic Association (ROIA). The five founding schools were Castle High School, Kahuku High School, Leilehua High School, Waialua High & Intermediate School and Waipahu High School. The OIA originally comprised all the rural schools on Oahu, which were all of the schools that were not situated in the main city of Honolulu. This changed however in 1970 with the addition of the five former public school members of the Interscholastic League of Honolulu – Farrington High School, Kaimuki High School, McKinley High School, Roosevelt High School and Kalani High School. After the public Honolulu schools joined, the league changed its identity from the ROIA to simply OIA to reflect the integration of all of the public high schools on the island.

The OIA now has 24 member schools who compete in 19 different junior varsity and varsity level sports. The league produces a number of quality athletic teams in a number of sports, especially football. The OIA concurs with the Hawaii Board of Education and Hawaii Department of Education in recognizing athletics as an integral part of the educational program of the high school and holds its athletes to a number of academic and behavioral standards.

Mission statement
The mission of the OIA is to promote unity and cooperation amongst the member schools in the establishment and administration of policies and regulations for implementing an interscholastic athletic program. The association shall stress educational and cultural values, promote skills in competitive activities and foster sportsmanship and mutual respect.

Members

Baseball
The OIA divides its baseball teams into 3 conferences spanning 2 divisions: OIA Division 1 East, Division 1 East, and Division 2 (combined East-West). 

Division 1 East
Castle Knights
Farrington Governors 
Kailua Surfriders
Kaiser Cougars
Kalani Falcons
Moanalua Na Menehune
Roosevelt Rough Riders

Division 1 West
Aiea Na Alii
Campbell Sabers
Kapolei Hurricanes
Leilehua Mighty Mules
Mililani Trojans
Pearl City Chargers
Waianae Seariders

Division 2
Kahuku Red Raiders
Kaimuki Bulldogs
Kalaheo Mustangs
McKinley Tigers
Nanakuli Golden Hawks
Radford Rams
Waialua Bulldogs
Waipahu Marauders

Football

Beginning in 2018, the OIA decided to divide its  football teams into 3 divisions/conferences: the OIA Open Division , OIA D1, and OIA D2. Teams are realigned every 2 years based on performance of both the varsity and junior varsity.

OIA Open Division 
Campbell Sabers
Farrington Governors 
Kahuku Red Raiders
Kapolei Hurricanes 
Mililani Trojans
Waianae Seariders

OIA D1 
Aiea Na'ali'i
Castle Knights
Kailua Surfriders
Leilehua Mules
Moanalua Na Menehune
Radford Rams
Waipahu Marauders 

OIA D2
Kaimuki Bulldogs
Kaiser Cougars
Kalaheo Mustangs
Kalani Falcons
McKinley Tigers
Nanakuli Golden Hawks
Pearl City Chargers
Roosevelt Rough Riders
Waialua Bulldogs

State Champions and Runners-up 
See: Oahu Prep Bowl

Division I 
Teams from the Oahu Interscholastic Association have competed in every Division I State Championship game since the creation of the championship in 1999. The OIA lost the first ever Division I state championship game in 1999 with the St. Louis Crusaders beating the Kahuku Red Raiders 19–0. In total, the OIA is 8–6 in the Division I State Championship.

Kahuku High School holds the current record for the most appearances (8) and wins (6) in the OIA and the state for the Division I title. Kahuku is also the current Division I champion after beating Punahou School 42–20 on November 23, 2012.

Division II 
Teams from the OIA have competed in the Division II State Championship game 6 of the 10 times it was held from 2003–2012. The OIA has won only 2 (in 2003 and 2004).

Aiea High School and Campbell High School are the only 2 OIA schools to have won the HHSAA Division II State Championship. Radford High School holds the record for most appearances by the OIA with 2 (2005 and 2008). Iolani School currently holds the state record for most Division II State Championships with 7 wins of 8 appearances (including a 6-game winning streak since 2007).

Football Rivalries

OIA Football Playoffs Bracket 2009

RED Division

RED-West Seeding
 Leilehua
 Waianae
 Kapolei
 Mililani
 Campbell

RED-East Seeding
 Kahuku
 Farrington
 Castle
 Kailua
 Kaimuki

RED-Champ: KAHUKU Red Raiders

2nd Place: LEILEHUA Mules

3rd Place:FARRINGTON Governors

Note: Will advance to play for HHSAA DI championship playoff. see HHSAA DI football championship bracket.
* Denotes Overtime Game

WHITE Division

WHITE-Champ: Moanalua Na Menehune

2nd Place: Aiea Na Ali'i

Note:
Will advance to play for HHSAA DII championship playoffs. see HHSAA DII football championship bracket.

OIA Football Playoffs Bracket 2010

RED Division

RED-West Seeding
 Mililani^
 Leilehua^
 Waianae^
 Radford
 Aiea

^ Clinched State Tournament Berth

RED-East Seeding
 Kahuku
 Kailua
 Castle
 Farrington
 Moanalua

RED-Champ: Mililani

2nd Place: Leilehua

3rd Place: Waianae

Note: 
Will advance to play for HHSAA DI championship playoff. see HHSAA DI football championship bracket.
* Denotes Overtime Game

WHITE Division

WHITE-Champ: Kaimuki

2nd Place: Kalaheo

Note:Will advance to play for HHSAA DII championship playoffs. see HHSAA DII football championship bracket.

OIA Football Playoffs Bracket 2011 to Present
OIA Football Playoff Brackets for seasons 2011 to present can be found in their respective OIA season pages.

References

External links
Official site of the Oahu Interscholastic Association

OIA Sports
Baseball | Basketball (boys and girls) | Bowling | Cheerleading | Cross Country | Football | Golf | Judo | Paddling | Riflery | Soccer (boys and girls) | Softball | Soft Tennis | Swimming | Tennis | Track and Field | Volleyball (boys and girls) | Water Polo | Wrestling |

Hawaii high school athletic conferences
Sports organizations established in 1940
1940 establishments in Hawaii